Kütahya Dumlupınar University is a public university in Kütahya, Turkey. The university began to operate as a new institution under the name of Kütahya Dumlupınar University on 3 July 1992, with the force of governmental decree numbered 3837; before it's been a part of the Anadolu University with The Faculty of Kütahya Economics and Administrative Sciences which was established on 12 October 1974 as The Business Administration High School of Kütahya under the name of  The Economics and Commercial Sciences Academy of Eskişehir.

The university has established and is keeping up close ties with universities abroad including University of Virginia in the United States, Brunel University in the United Kingdom, University of Pécs in Hungary and universities located at the member states of the former Soviet Union. Moreover, DPU hosts or takes part in the conferences, symposia, and cultural events organized by the collaborating institutions. Also the university is a member of the European University Association.

History
Kütahya Dumlupınar University was founded with date of 11 July 1992 and the number of 3837 law. This law also contained the foundation of the four faculties and two institute. Before had continued its activities under the name of Anadolu University Kütahya faculty of economics and administrative sciences and Kütahya vocational school constitute the university's seed.

On 12 October 1974 Kütahya faculty of economics and administrative sciences was founded under the name of Kütahya vocational school of administrative sciences connecting with the Eskişehir academy of economics and commerce sciences and started the education on 4 December 1974. Until 15 February 1979 it continues its activity of education as vocational school and beginning from this time it was transformed to the Kütahya the faculty of administrative sciences by the academy. After that, it was connected to the Eskişehir Anadolu university faculty of economics and administrative sciences with the date of 20 July 1982 and number of 41 governmental decree which has the force of law under the name of Kütahya administrative sciences. School lastly after 3 July 1992 continues its education activities connecting with the Dumlupınar university.

Kütahya vocational school started its education connecting with the minister of education in the 1975–1976 education time. From 11 July 1992 on it continues its education activities connecting with Kütahya Dumlupınar University.

The Faculty of Arts and Sciences, faculty of engineering, Simav faculty of technical education, Bilecik faculty of economics and administrative sciences and institutes of science and sociological sciences, Tavşanlı and Gediz vocational schools was found and started their activities in 1993–1994 education time.  With the decision of the committee of advanced studies on 14 February 1994 and the number of 94.5.332 fourteen vocational schools were founded in the ten district of Kütahya and four district of Bilecik. For the 1996/8655 protocol between yök and ministry of health the faculty of health was added the university.  With the date of 14 April 1999 and number of 23666 law the decision which was published in the official gazette the faculty of arts and sciences, faculty of education, faculty of fine arts, faculty of physical education were transformed into faculties.  In the 2005–2006 educational time the practical sciences department was founded.  With the law of 24 May 2006/10493 decision of the ministries institute of health sciences was founded.

With the law of 5662/29 May 2007 Bilecik university was founded and it was divided into one faculty and four vocational schools.

İn 2007 the university continues its education activity with six faculties, three advanced schools, two institutes, totally 26,999 undergraduates, 789 lecturers and 556 administrative personal and in a closed area which covers about 191,965 square meters.

Main campus
Located on the Kütahya-Tavşanlı highway, the main campus houses the Faculty of Arts and Sciences, Faculty of Engineering, Faculty of Economics and Administrative Sciences, Faculty of Education, Faculty of Medicine, Faculty of Fine Arts, Institute of Health Science, Institute of Social Sciences, Institute of Natural and Applied Sciences, Department of Information, Main Library, Health Centre and various indoor and outdoor sports facilities.

Germiyan campus
The Germiyan campus is located on the Afyon-Kütahya highway eight kilometres away from the city center. The campus houses Kütahya Vocational School, the School of Physical Education and Sports and various indoor and outdoor sports facilities.

The students are being hosted either at public or private dormitories that have the capacity to host all the incoming students; the former located at the city center has a capacity of 2,000 students. Also there are dormitory buildings at the main campus with a capacity of 1,500 students.

DPU provides both its students and the local community with a wide collection of selected publications and regularly updated electronic sources in various fields through its libraries. The university provides its students with computing services offering Internet access in several computer laboratories throughout the university. Moreover, it offers competitive opportunities of research in various areas with its research and development laboratories that hold the latest technological improvements.

Faculties, Departments and Schools

Undergraduate programs 
 Faculty of Education
 Computer and Teaching Sciences Training
 Educational Sciences
 Primary Education
 Turkish Training
 Special Training
 Secondary Education Social Sciences Training
 Secondary Education Life Sciences and Math Training
 Faculty of Arts and Sciences
 Math
 Physics
 Chemistry
 Biology
 Biochemistry
 Turkish Language and Literature
 History
 Archaeology
 Sociology
 Western Languages and Literature
 Education Sciences
 Faculty of Fine Arts
 Visual Communication Design
 Painting
 Ceramics and Glass
 Interior Design
 Handicrafts Design and Production
 Faculty of Economics and Administrative Sciences
 Management
 Economics
 Public Administration
 Public Finance
 Political Science and International Relations
 Econometrics
 Human Resources Management
 International Trade and Finance
 Faculty of Theology
 Basic Islamic Sciences
 Philosophy and Divinity
 Islamic History and Arts
 Primary School Teaching of Religion and Ethics
 Faculty of Architecture
 Architecture
 Industrial Design
 City and Zone Planning
 Faculty of Engineering
 Civil Engineering
 Mechanical Engineering
 Mining Engineering
 Materials Science and Engineering
 Electrical and Electronic Engineering
 Industrial Engineering
 Computer Engineering
 Geological Engineering
 Simav Faculty of Technology
 Manufacturing Engineering
 Electrical and Electronic Engineering
 Woodworking Industrial Engineering
 Energy Systems Engineering
 Control Engineering
 Industrial Design Engineering

References

External links
 Official website of Dumlupınar University
 List of EUA Members

Universities and colleges in Turkey
Kütahya Province
Educational institutions established in 1992
Buildings and structures in Kütahya Province
1992 establishments in Turkey